James Bond 007: The Duel is a 1992 action video game featuring the character of the British secret agent James Bond. It was developed by The Kremlin and published by Domark for Sega's Mega Drive/Genesis and Master System video game consoles, and the Game Gear handheld game console.

Gameplay
Armed with a pistol, the player controls James Bond through various side-scrolling enemy bases to rescue female hostages and arm a bomb placed at a strategic point to destroy the base. Along the way, Bond must battle numerous thugs and familiar bosses. The action takes place over five levels. It opens on the docks of a Caribbean island, then moves on to the jungle, an underground power plant inside a volcano, and a space shuttle launch pad. In the final level Bond must defeat Jaws and escape.

Development 
The Duel was released four years after Timothy Dalton's last outing as James Bond (in Licence to Kill), but his likeness is used in the game, most notably the opening screens, thus making it Dalton's last appearance as Bond to date. It was also the final Bond game to be released by Domark, who had released a series of Bond themed games beginning in 1985 with A View to a Kill.

It was the first Bond game not to be directly based on a movie or novel. Instead it featured an original storyline, albeit one featuring familiar villains including Jaws and Oddjob. Though The Duel'''s storyline was not its strong point, it did blaze a trail for future licence-holders EA, half of whose Bond output would be based on original storylines. One previous Bond game, the Delphine developed, The Stealth Affair, included an original storyline but the game was originally based on a generic Bond-style character named John Glames and only had the licence added for its US release.

The Sega Master System version is one of the few games that do not work properly on NTSC systems, although the Master System does not have region lock-out.

Reception

The game is often compared to Namco's Rolling Thunder'' series, although it was much less popular with the critics.

See also
 Outline of James Bond

References

External links
 

Duel
Game Gear games
Master System games
Sega Genesis games
Domark games
1992 video games
Video games developed in the United Kingdom
Video games scored by Matt Furniss